Alfred Müller-Armack (28 June 1901 – 16 March 1978) was a German economist and politician. He coined the term "social market economy" in 1946.

Müller-Armack was professor of economics at University of Münster and University of Cologne. He was a central figure of the "Cologne school". He always pointed out that the economy had to serve humanity. A regulatory environment should provide the basis for a form of competition that was to the best for all people.

In 1933 he published a book with some praise of Nazism, entitled Ideas of the State and Economy Order in the New Reich. The Nazis did however not like the book and a second edition was refused in 1935. He worked as an advisor to the Nazi regime and the German army, and contributed to discussions about the post-war economic order. When he became more and more disillusioned with the Nazi regime, he withdrew to his academic research and turned towards religious sociological studies. This resulted in a big volume entitled "Das Jahrhundert ohne Gott" (Century without God), published in 1948.

After the war, he joined the CDU and he coined the phrase “Social Market Economy” in his book “Wirtschaftslenkung und Marktwirtschaft” (Economic Steering and Market Economy), written in 1946 and published in 1947. In his understanding, the Social Market Economy combined the power and dynamism of a free market economy with a limited social equilibration and social security system. In 1950, he got a position as full professor at the University of Cologne.

Müller-Armack was a member of the Mont Pelerin Society an organization of free market economists and classical liberal thinkers established by Friedrich Hayek although Müller-Armack was less libertarian oriented than Hayek.

After 1952, he worked in the Federal Ministry for Economic Affairs under Ludwig Erhard (CDU) as section chief of the newly founded policy department (Grundsatzabteilung). From 1958 to 1963 he was Europa-Staatssekretär, (Under-)Secretary of State for European Affairs, in the ministry. The failure of the negotiations for the United Kingdom to join the European Economic Community prompted his resignation that became effective in late 1963.

He returned to the University of Cologne where he continued to teach until his retirement in 1970. Besides his academic and political activities, he held several business positions like member of the board of the European Investment Bank (EIB) and chairman of the board for the Rheinischen Stahlwerke (Rhenish steel works) in the 1960s and 1970s.

In 1971 he published his memoirs with the title „Auf dem Weg nach Europa“ (On the way towards Europe).

References

 

1901 births
1978 deaths
Politicians from Essen
Academic staff of the University of Cologne
Grand Crosses with Star and Sash of the Order of Merit of the Federal Republic of Germany
Academic staff of the University of Münster
20th-century  German economists
State Secretaries of Germany
Member of the Mont Pelerin Society